AII amacrine cells are a subtype of amacrine cells present in the retina of mammals. 
AII amacrine cell serve the critical role of transferring  light signals from rod photoreceptors to the retinal ganglion cells (which contain the axons of the optic nerve)

The Classical Rod Pathway described the role of AII amacrine cells in the mammalian retina. This can be summarised as follows:

 In scotopic conditions, if a rod photoreceptor receives light in scotopic (dark) conditions, it will hyperpolarise.
 The rod photoreceptor synapses with the rod bipolar cell. 
 This rod bipolar cell will directly (exclusively) synapse with an AII amacrine cell in sublamina B (within the inner plexiform layer)
 The AII amacrine cells becomes activated (i.e., it depolarises) when light stimulates a rod.

(Once activated, the AII amacrine cell then modulates the cone ON and OFF channels):

 In sublamina B, the dendrites of the AII amacrine cell also form gap junctions with:
 Other AII amacrine cells
 ON-cone bipolar cells
 In sublamina A, the dendrites of the AII amacrine cell usually form inhibitory glycinergic synapses onto the OFF-cone bipolar cells

The ON- and OFF- cone bipolar cells in turn contact the ON- and OFF-centre retinal ganglion cells, respectively.

Note: A small proportion of rods contact the cone bipolar cells directly.

Footnotes

References 

Cells